Haemaphysalis aculeata is a hard-bodied tick of the genus Haemaphysalis. It is found in India and Sri Lanka.

Parasitism
Adults parasitize various mammals such as domestic cattle, buffaloes and domestic goats. It is a potential vector of Kyasanur Forest disease virus.

References

External links
Haemaphysalis (Kaiseriana) aculeata Lavarra, 1904 (Ixodoidea: Ixodidae) re-description of adult and immature stages.

Ticks
Ixodidae
Animals described in 1904